Frank Howard or Frankie Howard may refer to:

Journalism
Frank Key Howard (1826–1872), American newspaper editor
Frank Howard (columnist) (1931–2008), Canadian journalist

Politics
Frank Geere Howard (1861–1935), British politician, member of the London County Council
Frank Howard (New York politician) (1873–1933), American politician, member of the New York State Assembly
Frank Howard (Canadian politician) (1925–2011), Canadian trade unionist and politician
Frank Howard (Louisiana politician) (1938–2020), American sheriff and member of the Louisiana House of Representatives

Sports
Frank Howard (American football coach) (1909–1996), American college football player and coach
Frank Howard (Australian footballer) (1923–2007), Australian rules footballer
Frank Howard (baseball) (born 1936), American former outfielder, coach and manager in Major League Baseball
Frankie Howard (footballer) (1931–2007), English association football player

Others
Frank Howard, an alias for Albert Fish (1870–1936), American serial killer
Frank Howard (painter) (1805–1866), British artist
Frank Ernest Howard (1888–1934), British architect
Frank Leslie Howard (1903–1997), American mycologist
Frank H. Howard, American attorney in Los Angeles

See also
Howard Frank (1871–1932), British businessman
Francis Howard (disambiguation)